This article refers to crime in the U.S. state of Illinois.

State statistics
In 2008, there were 446,135 crimes reported in Illinois, including 790 murders.

Policing 

In 2008, Illinois had 877 state and local law enforcement agencies. Those agencies employed a total of 52,838 staff. Of the total staff, 41,277 were sworn officers (defined as those with general arrest powers).

Police ratio 
In 2008, Illinois had 321 police officers per 100,000 residents.

Capital punishment laws

Capital punishment is not applied in Illinois. It was abolished in the 1970s then reintroduced and then cancelled again in 2011.

See also 
 Law of Illinois

References